The Darkest Minds is a 2018 American dystopian science fiction film directed by Jennifer Yuh Nelson and written by Chad Hodge. Based on Alexandra Bracken's 2012 young adult novel of the same name, it was produced by Shawn Levy and Dan Levine. The film stars Amandla Stenberg, Harris Dickinson, Mandy Moore and Gwendoline Christie. It follows a group of young children and teenagers who are on the run from the government after mysteriously obtaining superpowers.

On September 15, 2014, it was announced that 20th Century Fox had bought the rights to the novel and that Levy would produce the film through his 21 Laps Entertainment. Stenberg was cast two years later on September 26, 2016 and principal photography began in April 2017 in Atlanta, Georgia.

The Darkest Minds was released in the United States on August 3, 2018, by 20th Century Fox. It received negative reviews from critics, with criticisms towards its acting, direction, screenplay, and "lack of personality." The film was also a box-office bomb, having grossed just $41.1 million worldwide against a $34 million budget.

Plot
In a dystopian future, a contagious disease called Idiopathic Adolescent Acute Neurodegeneration (IAAN) kills nearly 90 percent of all children and teenagers living in the United States, leaving the survivors with unusual abilities. These survivors with superpowers are imprisoned throughout the country. The children are divided into groups: Green (have increased intelligence), Blue (telekinesis), Yellow (can manipulate electricity), Red (can control fire), and Orange (have telepathy and mind control capabilities). Ruby Daly is an Orange, which means she has the psionic ability to get into people's mind. Children that are Red and Orange are considered too dangerous with their powers and supposed to be killed instantly, but she touches the doctor who is classifying her and puts the thought in his head that she is a Green.

Six years later, Ruby is helped to escape her prison by a resistance group known as the Children's League to fight for her future. Cate, a worker at the camp, provides Ruby with a panic button that can be activated as a tracker if she is in danger. When Ruby gets visions while touching Rob, another League member, she becomes suspicious of their intentions. Ruby makes her escape with a mute little girl named Suzume (Zu), a Yellow. Zu takes Ruby to Liam, a Blue, and his friend Charles (Chubs), a Green. The three agree to let Ruby join them as they try to make their way to "East River," a purported safe haven led by an Orange named the "Slip Kid."

The four enter an abandoned mall to gather supplies, where they cross paths with another group of survivors. The others know where East River is, but the only clue they reveal — due to the subtle influence of Ruby's power — are the letters "E.D.O.". Ruby eventually deduces that this is a radio frequency, which reveals a transmission that East River is in Lake Prince, Virginia.

Journeying to East River, Ruby asks the group to drop her off at her former home in Salem, Virginia hoping she can reconcile with her parents. Seeing them through the glass door, she realizes she made them forget her and runs away. She meets up with Liam, who comforts her and they begin to develop a romantic connection, but Ruby refuses to touch him, fearing that her powers will hurt him. At East River, Slip Kid is revealed to be the president's son, Clancy Gray, who is an Orange. He teaches Ruby how to control her powers, and in return, has Ruby teach him how to erase people's memories. During this process, Clancy controls her mind and tries to kiss her.

It is revealed that Clancy is using his powers to control the government, and wants to use his new memory-erasing powers to turn Ruby to his side and forget her friends, but she manages to escape with the others. Liam flees with all of the haven children, while Ruby faces off against Clancy, destroying the camp and making her escape with Chubs. Chubs is severely injured, leaving Ruby no choice but to use her panic button to call the League for help.

The League gets Chubs to a hospital and lets Zu leave with a protective family. Ruby convinces Cate to release Liam in return for taking his place as a soldier in the League. Knowing that Liam will never leave without her, Ruby kisses him and erases all of his memories of herself. Liam leaves the camp, while Ruby begins her training with her fellow powered children in the League. Elsewhere, Clancy looks over the US Army and government forces.

Cast

Production
On September 15, 2014, it was announced that 20th Century Fox had bought the film rights to Alexandra Bracken's young adult novel The Darkest Minds, the first book in her The Darkest Minds series. Shawn Levy would produce the film along with Dan Levine and Dan Cohen through his 21 Laps Entertainment, while the television writer Chad Hodge was hired to write the adaptation. On July 12, 2016, it was reported that animation director Jennifer Yuh Nelson had been hired to direct the film, and it would be her first live-action project.

Casting
On September 26, 2016, Amandla Stenberg joined the film to play the lead role of Ruby Daly, a 15-year-old girl who runs away from her government camp and joins a group of teens. On January 17, 2017, it was reported that newcomer Harris Dickinson had signed on to play Liam, who also develops superpowers surviving the disease. In February 2017, Miya Cech was cast as Zu in her film debut, and Skylan Brooks was cast as Chubs. In March 2017, Mandy Moore was cast to play Cate, a doctor and member of an organization who is fighting against the government, and Patrick Gibson was cast as Clancy Gray, the president's son, whose posters are all over the camp for being “cured” of his powers. He also has the power of telepathy. Gwendoline Christie was also cast in the film to play a bounty hunter of teens who escape from the camp. In April 2017, Golden Brooks joined the film to play Ruby’s mother.

Filming
Principal photography on the film began in April 2017 in Atlanta, Georgia.

Music
Benjamin Wallfisch composed the score for the film. The soundtrack was released by Milan Records.

Reception

Box office
The Darkest Minds has grossed $12.7 million in the United States and Canada, and $28.4 million in other territories, for a total worldwide gross of $41.1 million, against a production budget of $34 million.

In the United States and Canada, The Darkest Minds was released on August 3, 2018, alongside Christopher Robin, The Spy Who Dumped Me and Death of a Nation: Can We Save America a Second Time?, and was originally projected to gross around $10 million from 3,127 theaters in its opening weekend. However after grossing $2.3 million on its first day, including $550,000 from Thursday night previews, weekend estimates were lowered to $6 million. It went on to debut $5.8 million, finishing eighth at the box office and marking the 12th worst opening for a film playing in over 3,000 theaters. It dropped 64% to $2.1 million in its second weekend, finishing 12th.

In its third weekend, the film grossed $255,173 and was pulled from 2,679 theaters (85.6 percent, 3,127 to 448), marking the largest third-weekend theater drop in history.

Critical response
The film received negative reviews. The website's critical consensus reads, "The Darkest Minds does little to differentiate itself in a crowded field of YA adaptations, leaving all but the least demanding viewers feeling dystopian déjà vu." On Metacritic, the film has a weighted average score of 39 out of 100, based on reviews from 28 critics, indicating "generally unfavorable reviews". Audiences polled by CinemaScore gave the film an average grade of "B" on an A+ to F scale.

A.A. Dowd of The A.V. Club called the film "a formulaic hodgepodge of secondhand plot points" and "an insult to its target demographic" of teen moviegoers. William Bibbiani of TheWrap praised the film and the cast, but concedes "it's not quite thrilling enough [...] so it plays a bit more like a manifesto than a sci-fi thriller." Monica Castillo of RogerEbert.com wrote that while the film has a "promising start", it "ultimately doesn’t quite deliver."

Potential sequel
The Darkest Minds is based on the first of four novels, three novellas and three short stories in The Darkest Minds series, and the film's ending sets the stage for future action. Director Jennifer Yuh Nelson has stated that she would be happy to return for a second film in the series, although no definitive plans have been announced. Reports indicate sequels are unlikely given the poor box office performance of the film.

References

External links

 
 

2010s science fiction thriller films
21 Laps Entertainment films
Films about Asian Americans
American science fiction thriller films
American dystopian films
Fiction about mind control
Films about telekinesis
Films based on American thriller novels
Films based on science fiction novels
Films about fictional presidents of the United States
Films based on young adult literature
Films directed by Jennifer Yuh Nelson
Films scored by Benjamin Wallfisch
Films shot in Atlanta
2010s English-language films
2010s American films